Satan Girl is a fictional supervillain from the Supergirl series of comics. Originally, she was an evil duplicate of Kara Zor-El created by red kryptonite in Adventure Comics #313 (1963). She attempted to kill Supergirl's fellow female Legionnaires so she could sustain her independent existence.

Satan Girl reappears in Legionnaires #17 (August 1994), as one of the time anomalies created by the events of Zero Hour.

The storyline in Supergirl (vol. 5) #3–6 (December 2005–March 2006) is inspired by the original Satan Girl story, with black kryptonite producing a duplicate "Dark Supergirl".

Dolores Pratchet
Dolores Pratchet was the post-Crisis on Infinite Earths Satan Girl, appearing in Supergirl (vol. 4) #40–41 (January–February 2000).

200 years ago in colonial America (1776), Dolores Pratchet, a practitioner of demonic rituals lost her daughter Rachel when the young girl tried to save her friend, a slave named Ember, from being burned at the stake for witchcraft. The two girls fused into one and became an Earth-Born Angel of Fire. However Ember began to fall from grace, dooming both her soul and Rachel's. Dolores made a deal with the demonic Carnivore and agreed to become his servant to save her daughter. He gave her magical powers and dubbed her Satan Girl. Satan Girl's magic was able to bridge time and pull the current Angel of Fire, Supergirl, from the present and switch her bodies with Ember, so that Supergirl would die on the stake, and Ember would exist in the future (along with Rachel). This disturbance of the timeline allowed Satan Girl to appear in the present with Ember. Supergirl was able to escape her death with the aid of Ember, who returned to her own time to live out her fate, and a sorceress known as Tammy Neil. By setting the timeline right, Satan Girl crumbled to dust as she was not alive in the correct timeline.

S'tanicule Gyrstress
This Satan Girl is from another dimension and is referred to as the Brocian goddess of love and death. Brainiac 5 blasts an old Brocian statue dedicated to her with chronon energy, ripping space and time and allowing her to free herself. She unleashes a crimson plague that makes the world love her as she primes the world for her people to take over. Supergirl and Brainiac 5 channel the time energy that freed her to send her back and trap her.

She appeared in Supergirl (vol. 5) Annual #2 (2010). Her appearance is similar to Dolores Pratchet.

Powers and abilities
The first Satan Girl had all of Supergirl's powers.

The second Satan Girl had various magical abilities, such as the power to cast spells and switch souls. Her trident fires blue flames that can burn through almost any substance and is strong enough to pierce invulnerable skin, such as Supergirl's.

External links

Characters created by Curt Swan
Characters created by Edmond Hamilton
Comics characters introduced in 1963
DC Comics characters with superhuman strength
DC Comics characters who can move at superhuman speeds
DC Comics characters with accelerated healing
DC Comics characters who use magic
DC Comics deities
DC Comics demons
DC Comics female supervillains
Fictional characters who can manipulate time
Fictional characters with spirit possession or body swapping abilities
Fictional characters with slowed ageing
Fictional characters with X-ray vision
Fictional characters with superhuman senses
Fictional characters with nuclear or radiation abilities
Fictional characters with air or wind abilities
Fictional characters with ice or cold abilities
Fictional characters with absorption or parasitic abilities
Fictional characters with energy-manipulation abilities
Fictional characters with fire or heat abilities
Fictional characters who can manipulate sound
Clone characters in comics
Fictional goddesses
Kryptonians